The Very Reverend  John Kenneth Young (5 January 1914 – 15 June 1991) was the Dean of St George's Cathedral, Georgetown, Guyana from 1948 until 1957.<ref>The Times, Tuesday, Jul 31, 1956; pg. 10; Issue 53597; col C      Ecclesiastical News Church Appointments Very Rev J.K. Young  (Dean of Georgetown) to be Perpetual Curate of St Peter’s Harton</ref> Born in 1914, he was educated at Clare College, Cambridge, ordained in 1939 after a period of study at Ripon College Cuddesdon and began his career with  curacies at St James, West Hartlepool  and St  Mary Magdalen, Medomsley''. From 1943 to 1948 he was vicar of  Demerara River, Guyana and then Dean of the Diocese's Cathedral. Returning to England he held incumbencies at Harton, North Yorkshire, Eastgate, County Durham and (his final post before retirement) Forcett, Richmondshire. Young died in Darlington, County Durham in June 1991 at the age of 77.

Notes

1914 births
1991 deaths
20th-century Guyanese Anglican priests
Alumni of Clare College, Cambridge
Alumni of Ripon College Cuddesdon
Deans of St George's Cathedral, Georgetown